Roman R. Kent (18 April 1929 – 21 May 2021) was a Polish Holocaust survivor. He was a Łódź Ghetto and Auschwitz Concentration Camp inmate. He was president of the International Auschwitz Committee.

Kent died in New York City, United States on 21 May 2021, aged 92. He wrote down the story of Lala, his much beloved dog while being a young boy in Poland, being forced into the Lodz ghetto with his family. It's the story about the love between a boy and his dog, who was taken from him by the German occupiers.

References

1929 births
2021 deaths
Polish emigrants to the United States
Łódź Ghetto inmates
Auschwitz concentration camp survivors
International Auschwitz Committee members
Officers Crosses of the Order of Merit of the Federal Republic of Germany